is a railway station in the town of Nagaizumi, Shizuoka Prefecture, Japan, operated by the Central Japan Railway Company (JR Tōkai ).

Lines

Station layout
The station has a single side platform serving traffic in both directions. As part of the Shizuoka Cancer Center medical complex, the station has a Barrier-free design, with slopes for wheelchair access, elevators and moving walkways. It has automated ticket machines and TOICA automated turnstiles, but is an unstaffed station.

History 
Nagaizumi-Nameri Station opened as an infill station on 7 September 2002 as part of the Shizuoka Cancer Center.

Station numbering was introduced to the Gotemba Line in March 2018; Nagaizumi-Nameri Station was assigned station number CB15.

Passenger statistics
In fiscal 2017, the station was used by an average of 942 passengers daily (boarding passengers only).

Surrounding area
Shizuoka Cancer Center

See also
 List of Railway Stations in Japan

References

External links

 Official website 

Railway stations in Japan opened in 2002
Railway stations in Shizuoka Prefecture
Gotemba Line
Stations of Central Japan Railway Company
Nagaizumi, Shizuoka